John Scotus (approx. A.D. 990 – 10 November 1066) was a Bishop of Mecklenburg from Scotland. It is likely this John can be identified as the John who was allegedly made Bishop of Glasgow sometime between 1055 and 1060 and possibly the same John allegedly holding the title of Bishop of Orkney.

Biography
From approximately 500 AD Slavonic tribes poured into Mecklenburg. By about 600, they had complete possession of the land. The chief god was Radegast Zuarasici, whose sanctuary at Rethra was the centre of his worship for the whole of Mecklenburg. Charlemagne's conquests in this region were lost soon after his death. Henry I of Germany (916-36) was the first to force the Slavonic territory again to pay tribute (circa 928); he also placed it under the jurisdiction of Saxon counts. With the dominion of the Germans, Christianity found ingress into the land.  However, antagonism to the tribute to the empire and the Saxon dukes led to a heathen reaction.

He was killed in 1066 during a Wendish revolt against Christianity, when he was sacrificed to Radegast, the god of hospitality.

References

Sources
 Watt, D. E. R., Fasti Ecclesiae Scotinanae Medii Aevi ad annum 1638, 2nd Draft, (St Andrews, 1969), p. 144
 Julius Wiggers: Kirchengeschichte Mecklenburgs, Verlag der Hinstorffśchen Hofbuchhandlung, 1840, pp. 24/25 Internet Archive
 Johannes Scotus, S. (152) in: Vollständiges Heiligen-Lexikon, Band 3. Augsburg 1869, p. 268 Zeno.org
 Alfred Rische: Verzeichnis der bischöfe und Domherren von Schwerin mit biographischen Bemerkungen. Ludwigslust, 1900.
 Josef Traeger: Johannes I., Scotus, ca. 1062-1066 in: Die Bischöfe des mittelalterlichen Bistums Schwerin, Leipzig: Benno 1984, pp. 16–18

See also
Lutici

1066 deaths
Medieval Gaels from Scotland
Bishops of Glasgow
John
Martyred Roman Catholic bishops
11th-century German Roman Catholic bishops
11th-century Christian martyrs
990s births